Dumbrava may refer to:

 in Romania

 Dumbrava, Mehedinți, a commune in Mehedinţi County, and its villages of Dumbrava de Jos, Dumbrava de Mijloc and Dumbrava de Sus
 Dumbrava, Prahova, a commune in Prahova County
 Dumbrava, Timiș, a commune in Timiș County
 Dumbrava, a village in Săsciori Commune, Alba County
 Dumbrava, a village in Zlatna Town, Alba County
 Dumbrava, a village in Unirea Commune, Alba County
 Dumbrava, a village in Pleșcuța Commune, Arad County
 Dumbrava, a village in Bogați Commune, Argeș County
 Dumbrava, a village in Gura Văii Commune, Bacău County
 Dumbrava, a village in Itești Commune, Bacău County
 Dumbrava, a village in Holod Commune, Bihor County
 Dumbrava, a village in Răchitoasa Commune, Bacău County
 Dumbrava, a village in Livezile Commune, Bistriţa-Năsăud County
 Dumbrava, a village in Nușeni Commune, Bistriţa-Năsăud County
 Dumbrava, a village in Căpușu Mare Commune, Cluj County
 Dumbrava, a village in Ulmi Commune, Dâmboviţa County
 Dumbrava, a village in Pestișu Mic Commune, Hunedoara County
 Dumbrava, a village in Ciurea Commune, Iaşi County
 Dumbrava, a village in Lespezi Commune, Iaşi County
 Dumbrava, a village in Târgu Lăpuş town, Maramureș County
 Dumbrava, a village in Vătava Commune, Mureș County
 Dumbrava, a village in Timișești Commune, Neamţ County
 Dumbrava, a village in Livada Town, Satu Mare County
 Dumbrava, a village in Cornu Luncii Commune, Suceava County
 Dumbrava, a village in Grănicești Commune, Suceava County
 Dumbrava, a village in Lungești Commune, Vâlcea County
 Dumbrava, a village in Panciu Town, Vrancea County
 Dumbrava, a village in Poiana Cristei Commune, Vrancea County
 Limba, a village in Ciugud Commune, Alba County, called Dumbrava from 1958 to 2004
 Dumbrava (river), a tributary of the Pereschivul Mic in Vaslui County

Additionally, two places in Romania are known in Hungarian as Dumbráva:

Custura village, Cășeiu Commune, Cluj County
Dumbrava village, Livezile Commune, Bistriţa-Năsăud County

 in Moldova
 Dumbrava, a village in Truşeni Commune, Chişinău Municipality

 in Ukraine

 Dumbrava, the Romanian name for Dibrivka village, Stara Zhadova Commune, Storozhynets Raion, Ukraine

See also
 
 Dumbrăveni (disambiguation)
 Dumbrăvița (disambiguation)
 Dubrava (disambiguation)